The Midland Professional Championship is an annual golf tournament played in the English Midlands. The event is organised by the Midlands Region of the Professional Golfers' Association. It is the oldest tournament in professional golf having been first contested in 1898.

History
The event was originally organised by the Midland Professional Golf Club, an early professional golfers' association. The club held its first meeting at Edgbaston golf club on 9 December 1897. A 36-hole stroke-play tournament was held, 25 professionals competing, followed by a business meeting at which officers were elected. Thomas Whare, the North Warwickshire professional, won with a score of 155, two strokes ahead of David Duncan and Frank Wingate. The initial plan was to hold four meetings a year. The second tournament was held at the Sutton Coldfield club in February 1898 and was won by Tom Williamson with a score of 162. At a meeting following the event it was decided to hold a Championship meeting at Harborne on 12 May, to be played over 54 holes.

The first championship meeting, in 1898, took an unusual form. There was a 36-hole tournament, which determined the distribution of the cash prizes. The leading 12 players then competed over a further 18 holes, the leading score over the 54 holes decided the championship with the runner-up also receiving a gold medal. The 36-hole stage was won by Sydney Wingate, with a score of 157, with Thomas Whare two strokes behind. A number of the leading 12 did not complete in the third round of the day. Wingate was paired with David Brown, the 1886 Open Champion, for the final round. Brown scored 35 for the first nine, to Wingate's 41, to lead by a stroke. Both took 41 for the second nine to give Brown a one stroke win over Wingate, with George Cawsey a further shot behind. Two further events were held in 1898, at Bulwell in August and at Olton in November. Harry Vardon was present at Olton and played a 9-hole foursomes after the tournament. Also at Olton, Edward Chance took over as president of the club.

The Midland Professional Golf Club again held four tournaments in 1899, in February at Kings Norton, in May at Sandwell Park, in September at Robin Hood and in November at Handsworth. The championship was contested at Sandwell Park but, unlike 1898, it was played as a 36-hole event like the other tournaments. Alfred Toogood won the championship. by a stroke from James Sherlock. In 1900 the schedule was reduced to two, a championship meeting in April and an open meeting in October, open to professionals from outside the Midland region. Tom Williamson won the championship, two strokes ahead of George Cawsey. The same format was used in 1901 with James Sherlock winning the championship, four strokes ahead of Cawsey.

In early 1902 the Midland Counties Competition, an organisation that ran some important amateur competitions in the Midlands and a predecessor of the current Midland Golf Union, passed a resolution recommending that clubs in the region subscribe a maximum of two guineas towards prize money in the two Midland professional tournaments. A sub-committee with Edward Chance as chairman, was created to organise the distribution of prize money. The initiative proved successful and helped fund the events. Also in 1902 the Midland Professional Golf Club amalgamated with the Professional Golfers' Association, which had been formed in 1901, becoming the Midland section of the PGA. Tom Williamson won the April event for a second time. The open autumn tournament saw Harry Vardon, JH Taylor, and James Braid competing and was won by JH Taylor.

The 1903 championship was won for a second time by James Sherlock, nine strokes ahead of the field. Sherlock was presented with a silver cup donated by Edward Chance. The "Chance Cup" became associated with the championship until the 1920s, although when it was first presented is unclear. 1903 also saw the first News of the World Match Play tournament, the first national event organised by the PGA. Each section was allocated a number of places in the final stage, the Midland section having 5 of the 32 places available. The autumn event acted as the qualifying event. A new trophy, the "Midland Challenge Cup", was purchased for the autumn competition.

Alfred Lewis won in 1904, a stroke ahead of James Sherlock. Tom Williamson and his brother Harry because of the sudden death of their mother. 1905 saw the first tie in the championship, between James Sherlock and Tom Williamson, both on 159. It was decided that the championship would be decided based on their performances at the autumn meeting. Williamson won the autumn tournament, thus winning both the Midland Challenge Cup and the Chance Cup. Sherlock and Williamson were absent from the 1906 championship and the tournament was won by Jack Fulford. Williamson won the championship in 1907 and 1909 and was runner-up to George Cawsey in 1908. Edward Veness won in 1910, ahead of Jack Oke, with Williamson in third place.

1911 saw the introduction of a second event for which sectional qualification was required. the Sphere and Tatler Foursomes Tournament. Qualification was based on individual stroke-play, qualifiers being drawn randomly into pairs for the finals stage. The Midland section was allocated 9 of the 64 places. The Midland section took the opportunity to switch the events; the Midland Challenge Cup being played as an open event in April, serving as the qualifying for the Sphere and Tatler Foursomes in May, while the championship and Chance Cup were played as a closed event in the autumn and acted as qualification for the News of the World Match Play. The reversal of the events caused some confusion in the press. Tom Williamson won the championship. The 1912 championship resulted in a tie between George Buckle and Harry Cawsey. They had a playoff the following morning but were still tied after both scored 76. They then played a further 18 holes in the afternoon which Buckle won, scoring 79 and Cawsey's 82. George Tuck won the championship in 1913 while the 1914 tournament was cancelled for the start of World War I.

The championship restarted in 1919, acting again as qualification for the News of the World Match Play. 10 places were available instead of the pre-war 5, the main event have been extended from 32 players to 64. Bert Weastell and Len Holland tied on 149, Weastell winning the 9-hole playoff, played the same evening. Although the Sphere and Tatler Foursomes was not revived after the war, another event, the Daily Mail Tournament, replaced it in the calendar and also involved sectional qualifying. The Midland Challenge Cup continued to be played in April while the championship continued to be played in September. In 1920 there was a three-way tie between Tom Williamson, George Buckle and Dick Wheildon. The following day there was a 36-hole playoff but Williamson and Wheildon were still tied and only after a further 9-hole playoff did Williamson win. In 1921 it was reported that the professionals were keen to separate the championship from the News of the World qualifying, and an extra event was organised in July for the qualifying. However the experiment was not repeated and from 1922 the September event reverted to covering both the championship and the qualifying. There was a surprise winner in 1921 when Willie Robertson won. However Tom Williamson won again in 1922 for what was to be the final time.

George Buckle, the 1912 champion, won in 1923 beating Ernest Hanton in the 18-hole playoff, played the following day. There was a four-way tie in 1924, Jack Bloxham winning the 18-hole playoff by two strokes. Buckle won for the third time in 1925, this time by three strokes. Ted Douglas, who had spent many year in New Zealand, won in 1926. In 1927 Tom Barber and Archie Compston tied on 147. Compston left immediately after the championship to play in the German Open and did not turn up for the playoff on the following day, Barber being awarded the championship by default.

The Daily Mail Tournament was not played from 1928 to 1935 and the opportunity was taken to separate the News of the World Match Play qualifying from the championship. The Midland Challenge Cup was awarded to the winner of the News of the World qualifying event, as was the case before 1911. In 1928 this was held in June with the championship in September but from 1929 the order was reversed, with the championship played in the early part of the year and the News of the World qualifying in September. There was a 5-way tie in the 1928 championship. Frank Weston won the 18-hole playoff the following day by two strokes. There was another playoff in 1929. George Buckle beat Tom Green by two strokes, for his fourth championship win. Green won a stroke in 1930 and retained the title in 1931, winning by four strokes. In 1932 Tom Barber  won the title for a second time after a three-way playoff. Charlie Ward won the title in 1933 by two strokes from Barber and Algy Holton.

From 1934 to 1937 Dunlop sponsored a number of regional events. In most cases these were new events but for the Midland region they sponsored the existing Midland Professional Championship. Charlie Ward retained the title in 1934. Bill Firkins won in 1935, while Bill Branch won by seven strokes in 1936 and Freddie Beck won in 1937. Except in 1935, when the event was not held, the winner gained entry to the end-of-season limited-field Dunlop-Metropolitan Tournament. Herbert Manton won the championship by four strokes in 1938. The Daily Mail Tournament had restarted in 1935. Sectional qualifying was initially separate from the championship but in the 1939 the two were combined. The event was over two days and was won by Bill Martin.

The championship restarted in September 1946, also acting as qualifying for the News of the World Match Play. However from 1947 it returned to an early season event. Walter Lees won in 1946 with his older brother Arthur Lees winning in 1948 and 1949. Charlie Ward, the 1933 and 1934 champion, won three more times in the 1950s, in 1950, 1953 and 1955, and for a sixth time in 1963. Another multiple winner was Jack Hargreaves, who won in 1952 and 1960. Sectional qualifying for the News of the World ended in 1961 and from 1962 was replaced by local qualifying immediately before the event. The 1965 championship was reduced to 27 holes after early morning delays meant that it proved impossible for the entire field to complete 36 holes in a single day. From 1966 the event was played over two days. Stuart Murray was the most successful golfer in the 1960s, winning three times, in 1964, 1967 and 1968.

Brian Waites won four times in the 1970s, in 1972, 1977, 1978 and 1979. He won in 1977 in a sudden-death playoff, the first in the championship's history, and in a second playoff in 1979. Uniroyal sponsored the event from 1970 to 1977.

Winners

Additional source:

From 1911 to 1927 (except in 1921) and in 1946 the championships were also the Midland section qualifying events for the News of the World Matchplay. The 1939 championship was the Midland section qualifying event for the Daily Mail Tournament. The 1954 championship acted as the qualifying event for the Goodwin (Sheffield) Foursomes Tournament while the 1959 event was the qualifying for the Sherwood Forest Foursomes Tournament.

References

Golf tournaments in England
Recurring sporting events established in 1898
1898 establishments in England